No Orchids for Miss Blandish (US re-release title Black Dice) is a 1948 British gangster film adapted and directed by St. John Legh Clowes from the 1939 novel of the same name by James Hadley Chase. It stars Jack La Rue, Hugh McDermott, and Linden Travers (reprising her title role from the West End play by Chase and Robert Nesbitt), with unbilled early appearances from Sid James, as a barman, and Walter Gotell, as a nightclub doorman. Due to the film's strong violence and sexual content for its time, amongst other reasons, several critics have called it one of the worst films ever made.

Plot
Miss Blandish (Linden Travers), a sheltered heiress, is targeted for a simple robbery by a cheap thug who ultimately involves two groups of rival gangsters, their goal being her diamond jewelry worth $100,000. The robbery is botched when Riley (Richard Nielson) kills her bridegroom and the three would-be robbers decide to kidnap Miss Blandish for ransom instead (her father is worth $100 million).

The three original kidnappers are killed, and Blandish ends up the captive of the Bailey gang. Her father puts a private detective on the case. The rival Grisson gang, led by Ma Grisson (Lilli Molnar), intends to collect the ransom and kill Blandish rather than take the risk of releasing her. Meanwhile, Slim Grisson (Jack La Rue) and Blandish fall in love and plan on running off together.

Blandish sends the diamonds to her father with a note saying she is in love with Slim, but he refuses to believe it. Ma Grisson is shot by rival gangsters when she cannot get Slim to the phone. The police surround the cabin where Slim and Miss Blandish are holed up and gun Slim down, "rescuing" the kidnap victim and returning her safely home. She throws herself from her balcony over the loss of Slim.

Cast
 Jack La Rue as Slim Grisson 
Gene D. Phillips of Loyola University of Chicago wrote he was "modeled after Popeye" of the William Faulkner novel Sanctuary. La Rue previously played Trigger, the equivalent of Popeye in The Story of Temple Drake.
 Hugh McDermott as Dave Fenner 
 Linden Travers as Miss Blandish 
 Walter Crisham as Eddie Schultz 
 MacDonald Parke as Doc
 Danny Green as Flyn 
 Lilli Molnar as Ma Grisson 
 Charles Goldner as Louis, Headwaiter 
 Zoe Gail as Margo 
 Leslie Bradley as Ted Bailey
 Richard Neilson as Riley
 Frances Marsden as Anna Borg
 Michael Balfour as Barney
 Bill O'Connor as Johnny

Production
Phillips wrote that "It is a matter of record that [the source novel] was heavily indebted to Sanctuary for its plot line."

Jane Russell was sought for the leading role. The part was eventually played by Linden Travers.

The film was meant to be the first of eight films shot in Britain that were set in America. James Minter was the executive behind the idea.

Censorship

The British Board of Film Censors requested that a 45-second kiss be reduced to 20 seconds.  They also requested a scene be reshot where a character was beaten to death, which cost the producers three thousand pounds.

Reception
The film caused enormous controversy upon its release, because of the high levels of violence that had gotten past the British film censors. Though made with a largely British cast, it was set in New York, with the actors often struggling with their American accents.

No Orchids for Miss Blandish received strong criticism for its treatment of violence and sexuality. Cliff Goodwin says that it was "unanimously dubbed 'the worst film ever made'" by British reviewers. The Monthly Film Bulletin called it "the most sickening exhibition of brutality, perversion, sex and sadism ever to be shown on a cinema screen". The Observer reviewer, C.A. Lejeune, described the film as "this repellent piece of work" that "scraped up all the droppings of the nastier type of Hollywood movie". The Sunday Express film reviewer called No Orchids for Miss Blandish "the worst film I have ever seen". The British film critic Derek Winnert quotes reviewer Dilys Powell as writing that the film should be ‘branded with a "D" certificate for disgusting’. The Australian newspaper The Age also gave a harsh review: "No Orchids for Miss Blandish is not only a disgrace to the studio that made it, but it also reflects on the British industry as a whole...the entire production is unpardonable". The film was also denounced by the Bishop of London, William Wand, and several UK politicians, including Edith Summerskill. Despite this condemnation, the film was commercially successful.

Later critics have been equally dismissive, though for different reasons. Leslie Halliwell described No Orchids for Miss Blandish as a "hilariously awful gangster film...one of the worst films ever made". Leonard Maltin in Leonard Maltin's Classic Movie Guide states No Orchids for Miss Blandish "aspires to be a Hollywood film noir and misses by a mile".

A number of cinemas refused to show the film.

The film broke box office records in Britain in territories where it was not banned.

Other versions
Another film based on the novel is The Grissom Gang by Robert Aldrich (1971).

See also
 List of films considered the worst

References

External links
 
 
Review of film at Variety
 

1948 films
1948 romantic drama films
British black-and-white films
British romantic drama films
Films about kidnapping
Films based on British novels
Films based on works by James Hadley Chase
Films set in New York City
British gangster films
1940s English-language films
1940s British films